Sally Y. Jameson is a former American politician who represented district 28 in the Maryland House of Delegates and served as chairman of the Southern Maryland Delegation.

Background
Sally Jameson was born Prince Frederick, Maryland. She attended Notre Dame High School, Bryantown, Maryland; St. Mary's Academy, Leonardtown, Maryland; Charles County Community College/College of Southern Maryland.

In the legislature
Jameson was a member of the House Economic Matters Committee and its alcoholic beverages and its public utilities work groups. She also served on the committee's unemployment insurance subcommittee and was a member of the Joint Committee on Unemployment Insurance Oversight.

Legislative notes
voted for the Clean Indoor Air Act of 2007 (HB359)

References

http://mgaleg.maryland.gov/webmga/frmmain.aspx?pid=legisrpage&tab=subject6&s=fhse

Democratic Party members of the Maryland House of Delegates
Living people
Women state legislators in Maryland
People from Prince Frederick, Maryland
People from Bryantown, Maryland
People from Leonardtown, Maryland
21st-century American politicians
21st-century American women politicians
Year of birth missing (living people)